Estadio Gilberto Parada is a multi-use stadium in Montero, Bolivia.  It is currently used mostly for football matches and serves as the home of Guabirá of the Liga de Fútbol Profesional Boliviano.  The stadium has a capacity of 13,000 people.

References

External links
Stadium information

Gilberto Parada
Buildings and structures in Santa Cruz Department (Bolivia)